Fougère, is one of the main olfactive families of perfumes. The name comes from the French language word for "fern". Fougère perfumes are made with a blend of fragrances: top-notes are sweet, with the scent of lavender flowers; as the more volatile components evaporate, the scents of oakmoss, derived from a species of lichen and described as woody, sharp and slightly sweet, and coumarin, similar to the scent of new-mown hay, become noticeable. Aromatic fougère, a derivative of this class, contains additional notes of herbs, spice and/or wood.

The name originated with Houbigant Parfum's Fougère Royale. This perfume, created by Houbigant owner Paul Parquet, was later added to the scent archives known as the Osmothèque, in Versailles, France. Houbigant re-introduced this fragrance in 2010.

Perfumes of this type are especially popular as fragrances for men. Many modern fougère perfumes have various citrus, herbaceous, green, floral and animalic notes included. The most common additions to the basic fragrance blend include vetiver and geranium. Bergamot is often present to add sharpness to the lavender top-note.

Examples of men's fragrances which fall into the fougère class include Brut by Fabergé, Paco Rabanne Pour Homme, Azzaro Pour Homme, Boss by Hugo Boss, Prada for Men, Eternity for Men by Calvin Klein, Canoe for Men by Dana, Dolce & Gabbana Pour Homme, Drakkar Noir by Guy Laroche, Tabac for Men, Michael for Men by Michael Kors, Clubman Pinaud After Shave and Special Reserve, Polo Blue and Chaps by Ralph Lauren, Kouros by Yves Saint Laurent, Bracken Man by Amouage, and English Blazer by Yardley London.

See also
Perfume
List of perfumes

References

Further reading
New Perfume Handbook Editor	N. Groom, Springer Science & Business Media, 1997, 9780751404036

Perfumery
Perfumes

fr:Fougère